The Saudi Red Crescent Authority (SRCA) is a humanitarian society that provides emergency medical services in five administrative regions of the Kingdom of Saudi Arabia. It was founded in 1934 under the name Saudi Red Crescent Association, which was later amended to Saudi Red Crescent Authority in 2008. By 2009, the Society had 447 First Aid Centers, run by 5,507 staff, with 1300 ambulances which are distributed in all hospitals and centres around the country. The Red Crescent has a particular role to play during Hajj (the annual pilgrimage to Mecca), providing on-the-spot first aid and using its fleet of vehicles (1300 in 2009) to take emergency cases to the nearest medical facility.

The Saudi Red Crescent Authorities offer medical service of first aid to citizens and foreign labors who are staying in the kingdom in ordinary circumstances and at time of catastrophes. The Authority contributes relief work inside the Kingdom and abroad. It offers service according to Islamic morals and instructions.

Establishment of the National Medical Emergency Association 
It was the first independent medical entity in the Kingdom of Saudi Arabia, as no previous organizational association for ambulatory services existed before the year of 1353 H. That idea brought up by key men of education and business and philanthropy to form the authority due to the war between Saudi Arabia and Yemen. Battles broke out in mountains of Asir and Tihamah coasts where no convenient facilities or medical supplies for the wounded civilians and militants were available.

The elite people in Saudi Arabia decided to strongly participate with their effort and prospects in that war to relieve the harshness of the war on the army. For that they requested from the government to form an authority in Mecca assigned to perform ambulatory services of militants by doctors and medicines and bandages during the war.

Ambulance Charity Association 
As the government of the late King Faisal bin Abdul-Aziz believed in the necessity of providing ambulatory medical care within the delivered services with more wide and independent method, the idea of establishing the association was proposed in the year of 1353 H by key personalities in Makkah. As they noticed the difficulties encountered by pilgrims while performing Hajj rituals, those people, the late Tala'at Harb Pasha was one of them, intended to support pilgrims with first aid and medical services. Heatstroke, exhaustion due to diseases and the age issues afflicted pilgrims at that time and their families are the one who took care of transferring them to Ajyad hospital, the only hospital in Mecca at that time. Those problems increased rapidly and caused the death of patients due to delays in transferring them to the hospital.

References

External links 

 Official website
 Standing Commission of the Red Cross and Red Crescent
 International Committee of the Red Cross (ICRC)
 International Federation of Red Cross and Red Crescent Societies (IFRC)
 Red Crescent and Red Cross Club

Medical and health organisations based in Saudi Arabia
Air ambulance services
1935 establishments in Saudi Arabia
Red Cross and Red Crescent national societies